CITYpeek LLC. is an internet company founded in 2002 in Baltimore, Maryland. It started by operating a website providing regional information on hotels, restaurants and entertainment in the New York — Philadelphia — Washington DC region, including reviews and online bookings. It has morphed to become a resource for food, wine, luxury travel and social media. Founded and CEO Patti Neumann continues at the helm.

History

Citypeek was launched in 2002 to cover the Baltimore — Washington area, and expanded to New York and Philadelphia in 2008 along with a major site redesign.

References

 Citypeek forms partnership with Meetlocalbiz.com - Baltimore Business Journal
 NewsLibrary.com - newspaper archive, clipping service - newspapers and other news sources

Companies based in Baltimore
Companies established in 2002
2002 establishments in Maryland